Cardigan Mountain State Park is a  public recreation area in Orange, New Hampshire. The state park is free to use, open year-round, and offers a hiking trail up to the 3,121-foot treeless granite summit of Mount Cardigan plus places to picnic.

References

External links
Cardigan Mountain State Park New Hampshire Department of Natural and Cultural Resources
Cardigan Mountain State Park Trail Map New Hampshire Department of Natural and Cultural Resources

State parks of New Hampshire
Parks in Grafton County, New Hampshire
Protected areas established in 1939
1939 establishments in New Hampshire